The Jackson 5 is an American music group, which began forming around 1963-1965 by the Jackson family brothers Jackie, Jermaine, Marlon, Michael and Tito. In 1967, the quintet's first singles were recorded in Chicago and released by Steeltown Records, which was located in their hometown of Gary, Indiana. The songs released by "Steeltown" in 1968 included "Big Boy" (sung by Michael Jackson), "You've Changed", and "We Don't Have To Be Over 21 (to Fall in Love)". Although "Steeltown" is best known in Gary and northwest Indiana for giving the Jackson 5 their actual start in the music industry (and "Motown") by releasing their first records, music journalist Nelson George claimed that Michael Jackson and the Jackson 5's "real" recording history did not begin until their move to Motown Records in 1968. The then Detroit-based company, led by Berry Gordy, housed established recording artists such as Stevie Wonder, Marvin Gaye and Diana Ross, as well as a producing-writing team known as "The Corporation". In 1969 and 1970, the Jackson 5 hit singles such as "I Want You Back", "ABC", and "The Love You Save" (1970), were written by the Motown team, and aided the five brothers in becoming the first black teen idols.

The success of the Jackson 5 continued throughout the early 1970s, as "Jackson mania" emerged due to the fan frenzy caused by American teens. A notable hit single for the group at this time was "Dancing Machine", a dance song produced by Hal Davis, which also contained elements of the emerging disco sound. Despite the success of the single and their overall success at Motown, four of the Jackson brothers decided to part with the company in 1976, and moved to Epic Records. The group left behind brother Jermaine and the "5" at the end of their name, as they established themselves as "the Jacksons" with the addition of younger sibling Randy. At Epic, the five entered into a two-album collaboration with songwriters Kenny Gamble and Leon Huff, who produced "Enjoy Yourself", the biggest success from the partnership.

As Michael Jackson achieved solo success with the studio albums Off the Wall (1979) and Thriller (1982), his musical artistry matured on collaborations with his brothers. The Jacksons' "This Place Hotel"—from the siblings' Triumph (1980)—contained the singer's first use of sound effects, horror film motifs and vocal trickery to convey a sense of danger to listeners. The song preceded similar large-scale solo productions, such as "Wanna Be Startin' Somethin'", "Thriller" and "Smooth Criminal". The singing efforts of Michael and his brothers led to the group being inducted into the Rock and Roll Hall of Fame in 1997 and the Vocal Group Hall of Fame in 1999. Two of the band's recordings ("ABC" and "I Want You Back") are among the Rock and Roll Hall of Fame's "500 Songs that Shaped Rock and Roll", with the latter track also included in the Grammy Hall of Fame.

Featured songs

Unreleased songs

Collaborations 

Also The Jackson 5 sang backing vocals on a number of solo Motown songs by Michael.

See also 
 List of record labels
 The Jackson 5 discography

References 
 Footnotes

 Bibliography

 George, Nelson (2004). Michael Jackson: The Ultimate Collection booklet. Sony BMG.

Forever

 
Lists of songs recorded by American artists